The 1980 European Cup Winners' Cup Final was a football match contested on 14 May 1980 between Valencia of Spain and Arsenal of England. The final was held at Heysel Stadium in Brussels, Belgium. Valencia won the match 5–4 on penalties. It was the 20th European Cup Winners' Cup final and the only time that the winner was decided by a penalty shoot-out. It was Valencia's third major European title after their two Inter-Cities Fairs Cup victories in the 1960s.

Route to the final

Match

Details

See also
1980 European Cup Final
1980 UEFA Cup Final
1980 European Super Cup
Arsenal F.C. in European football
Valencia CF in European football

References

External links
1980 European Cup Winners' Cup Final at Rec.Sport.Soccer Statistics Foundation

3
Cup Winners' Cup Final 1980
Cup Winners' Cup Final 1980
Cup Winners' Cup Final 1980
UEFA Cup Winners' Cup Finals
European Cup Winners' Cup Final 1980
Euro
Euro
Euro
1980s in Brussels
Sports competitions in Brussels